Maheshwara murtas are forms of Shiva revered in the Shivagamas of southern Shaiva Siddhanta sect of Saivism. It is usually counted to twenty five. Sritattvanidhi calls these as Panchavimsatilīlāmūrti (twenty five sportive forms). These forms are based on Puranas and Ithihasa (history) in which Shiva's divine play is explained with different stories. Most of these forms are present in South Indian temples as main deities of sanctum or sculptures and reliefs in the outer walls of Shiva temples.

Description 
Hindu iconography on Shiva is well developed in middle age all over India with his various divine plays described in Purana- ithihasas. Shivagamas tells devotees to worship these forms for distinct purposes. There are so many numbers of these forms available. Most prevalent is twenty five maheshwara murtams or Panchavimsati murtams mentioned in Shivagamas and sixty four shiva murtams (Ashdashta Murtas).

25 Maheshwara murtas  
The common list believed as twenty five Maeshwara murtas is given below.

See also 
 Nataraja, form of Shiva

References

External links 
 25 Maheshwara murtams
 Pictures of 64 forms of Shiva

Forms of Shiva